, was a medieval Japanese blacksmith widely acclaimed as Japan's greatest swordsmith. He created swords and daggers, known in Japanese as tachi and tantō, in the Sōshū school. However, many of his forged tachi were made into katana by cutting the tang (nakago) in later times. For this reason, his only existing works are katana and tantō. No exact dates are known for Masamune's life. It is generally agreed that he made most of his swords between 1288 and 1328. Some stories list his family name as Okazaki, but some experts believe this is a fabrication to enhance the standing of the Tokugawa family.

Masamune is believed to have worked in Sagami Province during the last part of the Kamakura period (1288–1328), and it is thought that he was trained by swordsmiths from Bizen and Yamashiro provinces, such as Saburo Kunimune, Awataguchi Kunitsuna and Shintōgo Kunimitsu. He was the father of Hikoshiro Sadamune, also a famous Sōshū master.

An award for swordsmiths called the Masamune Prize is awarded at the Japanese Sword Making Competition. Although not awarded every year, it is presented to a swordsmith who has created an exceptional work.

Style 

The swords of Masamune possess a reputation for superior beauty and quality, remarkable in a period where the steel necessary for swords was often impure.

Masamune studied under Shintōgo Kunimitsu and made blades in suguha (straight temper line), but he made notare hamon, where the finish on the leading edge of blade slowly undulates where it was quenched. There are also some blades with ko-midare (small irregularities), a style which appears to have been copied from the Old Bizen and Hōki Province styles. His works are well-characterized by striking chikei (dark lines following the grain pattern in the steel above the hamon), kinsuji (lightning shaped lines of nie) and nie (crystals of martensite embedded in a pearlite matrix).

Swords created by Masamune often are referred to with the smith's name (as with other pieces of artwork) and often with a name for the individual sword as well. The "Honjo Masamune", a symbol of the Tokugawa shogunate and passed down from shōgun to shōgun, is perhaps the best known Masamune sword.

Signed works of Masamune are rare. The examples "Fudo Masamune", "Kyōgoku Masamune", and "Daikoku Masamune" are accepted as his genuine works. Judging from his style, he was active from the late Kamakura period to the Nanboku-chō period.

His swords are the most frequently cited among those listed in the Kyōho Meibutsu Cho, a catalogue of excellent swords in the collections of daimyō edited during the Kyōhō era by the Hon'ami family of sword appraisers and polishers. The catalogue was created on the orders of the Tokugawa Yoshimune of the Tokugawa shogunate in 1714 and consists of three books. The first book, known as the Nihon Sansaku, is a list of the three greatest swordsmiths in the eyes of Toyotomi Hideyoshi including Etchu Matsukura Go Umanosuke Yoshihiro, Awataguchi Toshiro Yoshimitsu, and lists forty-one blades by Masamune. The three books together list sixty-one blades by Masamune. There are far more blades listed for Masamune than the next two swordsmiths combined. It is known that Hideyoshi had a passion for Soshu swordsmiths which may explain this. A third of all swords listed are Soshu blades by many of the greatest Soshu masters including Masamune's students.

Legends of Masamune and Muramasa
A legend tells of a test where Muramasa challenged his master, Masamune, to see who could make a finer sword. They both worked tirelessly, and when both swords were finished, they decided to test the results. The contest was for each to suspend the blades in a small creek with the cutting edge facing against the current. Muramasa's sword, the  cut everything that passed its way; fish, leaves floating down the river, the very air which blew on it. Only leaves were cut. However, the fish swam right up to it, and the air hissed as it gently blew by the blade. After a while, Muramasa began to scoff at his master for his apparent lack of skill in the making of his sword. Smiling to himself, Masamune pulled up his sword, dried it, and sheathed it. All the while, Muramasa was heckling him for his sword's inability to cut anything. A monk, who had been watching the whole ordeal, walked over and bowed low to the two swordmasters. He then began to explain what he had seen.

In another account of the story, both blades cut the leaves that went down on the river's current equally well, but the leaves would stick to the blade of Muramasa whereas they would slip on past Masamune's after being sliced. Alternatively, both leaves were cut, but those cut by Masamune's blade would reform as it traveled down the stream. Yet another version has leaves being sliced by Muramasa's blade while the leaves were repelled by Masamune's, and another again has leaves being sliced by Muramasa's blade and healed by Masamune's.

In yet another story Muramasa and Masamune were summoned to make swords for the shōgun or emperor, and the finished swords were held in a waterfall. The result is the same as the other stories, and Masamune's swords are deemed holy swords. In one version of the story, Muramasa is killed for creating evil swords.

While all known legends of the two ever having met are historically impossible, both smiths are widely regarded as symbols for their respective eras.

Students 

Masamune is believed to have trained a great number of sword smiths; 15 are known, 10 of whom are considered to be the Juttetsu or "Ten Famous Students" or "10 Great Disciples of Masamune".

Great Juttetsu

Chogi 
(備州長船住長義作—Bishu Osafune Ju Nagayoshi Saku) (備州國長船住長義—Bizen Kuni Osafune Ju Nagayoshi)
Although probably not a direct student of Masamune because of the dates when he was forging, his works are greatly influenced by Masamune's work and the Soshu tradition as well as the work of the Soden Bizen swordsmiths. Though the kanji characters are pronounced in Japanese as 'Nagayoshi', by convention the on'yomi (Sino-Japanese reading) pronunciation of 'Chogi' is used for this smith and a handful of others (less commonly for his student Kanenaga, pronounced in on'yomi as 'Kencho').

Kanemitsu 
(備前國長船住兼光—Bizen Kuni Osafune Ju Kanemitsu) (備前長船住兼光—Bishu Osafune ju Kanemitsu) (備前國長船住左衛門尉藤原兼光—Bizen no Kuni Osafune ju Saemonjo Fujiwara Kanemitsu)
Considered to have created some of the sharpest swords ever known, he is one of a handful of smiths rated at Sai-jo O-wazamono (grandmaster of great sharpness) with famous swords named Kabutowari (Helmet Cutter), Ishikiri (Stone Cutter), and Teppokiri (Gun Cutter) as relayed in Fujishiro's writings. Kanemitsu produced swords used by renowned men and generals. He likely was not taught directly by Masamune, however, but was influenced by the Soshu, crafting swords in addition to serving himself as a leader in the Soden Bizen revolution.

Shizu Saburo Kaneuji 
(兼氏—Kaneuji)
Lived in Yamato province before going to Mino to study under Masamune where his style radically changed. His swords are most like those of Masamune and quite often confused with his. The Mishina school can trace its history back to Kaneuji and Masamune.

Kinju 
(金重) 
Kinju, like Chogi, by convention is pronounced in on'yomi. He is also known as Kaneshige using the Japanese pronunciation of his name. He and Kaneuji are founders of the Mino style. He was a monk at the Seisen-ji in Tsuruga and led to the creation of Echizen swordmaking like Kuniyuki, moving to Mino around the time of Ryakuo (1338–1342) creating the Seki tradition.

Kunishige 
(長谷部国重—Hasebe Kunishige)
Created the Hasebe school producing swords in the style of the second period of Soshu and Yamashiro. His swords are considered by some to be equal to Akihiro and Hiromitsu. He created the Heshikiri Hasebe (The Forceful Cutter) listed in the Kyoho Meibutsu Cho, owned by Toyotomi Hideyoshi and then by Oda Nobunaga. It bears a gold appraisal inlay of Honami Kotoku called a Kinzogan (金象嵌). Today the sword is a family heirloom of the Kuroda Daimyō Ke. The sword takes its name from the story of Oda Nobunaga drawing it to cut through a table to kill Kannai, a tea master who betrayed him.

Kunitsugu 
(来源国次—Rai Minamoto Kunitsugu)
Also goes by the name Kamakura Rai as he is the grandson of Rai Kuniyuki. The influence of the Soshu and Yamashiro traditions can be observed in his works.

Saemonzaburo 
(左—Sa) (筑州左—Chikushu Sa) (筑前國住左—Chikuzen no Kuni ju Sa)
Believed to go by the name Yasuyoshi but signed his work using the first two letters of his given name. Considered by some to be one of the greatest of Masamune's students. As well as being a Soshu swordsmith he also created the Chikuzen tradition.

Saeki Norishige 
(則重—Norishige, 佐伯—Saeki)
Historically considered one of the best of Masamune's students, he is numbered among the Juttetsu. However, current research indicates that he was a senior student to Masamune, junior to Yukimitsu, under the great teacher Shintōgo Kunimitsu. He, like Go, hailed from Etchu province and is well known as the only smith to have mastered the style of matsukawa-hada (pine tree bark pattern steel), making his work unique.

Go Yoshihiro 
(郷(江)—Go, 義弘—Yoshihiro)
Very few works exist by this swordsmith because of his death at age 27. No known signed works exist. He is believed to have gone by the name of Go Yoshihiro or simply Go, the name of the town from which he came. As well as being a Soshu swordsmith he is a member of the Etchu tradition. He is considered to have the highest skill in forging swords among the Masamune Juttetsu .

Naotsuna 
(石州出羽直綱作—Sekishu Izuwa Naotsuna Saku) (直綱作—Naotsuna Saku)
Many theories exist that he may in fact have been a student of Saemonzaburo among others. His work is considered by many to have been influenced by Soshu(相州) even if not taught by Masamune directly, he is also influenced by the Soden Bizen(備前) and Iwami province (石州) style.

Other students 

 Hiromitsu (相模國住人廣光—Sagami Kuni Junin Hiromitsu): Along with Akihiro brought about the second period of the Soshu style.
 Hikoshiro Sadamune: A student and the son or adopted son of Masamune. Like his father he left no signed work but is considered peerless in the Soshu tradition after Masamune. Sadamune was slightly less skilled than his great father.
 Akihiro (相州住秋廣—Soshu Ju Akihiro) (相模國住人秋廣—Sagami Kuni Junin Akihiro): A direct student of Masamune, along with Hiromitsu was responsible for refining the Soshu style to create the Soshu second period.

Swords
Many of his forged tachi were made into katana by cutting the tang (nakago) in later times. For this reason, his only existing works are katana and tantō. In this way, cutting the tang of an old tachi and remaking it into a katana in accordance with the popularity of katana was called suriage, which was common in Japanese history.

Honjō Masamune
The Honjō Masamune represented the Tokugawa shogunate during most of the Edo period and was passed down from one shōgun to another. It is one of the best known of the swords created by Masamune and is believed to be among the finest Japanese swords ever made. It was made a Japanese National Treasure (Kokuhō) in 1939.

The name Honjō probably came about by the sword's connection to General Honjō Shigenaga (1540-1614) who gained the sword after a battle in 1561. Shigenaga was attacked by Umanosuke who already possessed a number of trophy heads. Umanosuke struck Shigenaga with the Honjō Masamune which split his helmet, but he survived and took the sword as a prize. The blade had a number of chips from the great battle but was still usable. It was kept by Shigenaga until he was sent to Fushimi Castle around 1592.

Shigenaga was later forced to sell the sword to Toyotomi Hidetsugu, Toyotomi Hideyoshi's nephew and retainer. It was bought for 13 Mai, 13 ōban, which was 13 large gold coins. The blade was later valued in the Kyoho Meibutsu Cho at 1,000 Mai. It then went to Toyotomi Hideyoshi, Shimazu Yoshihiro, again to Hideyoshi, Tokugawa Ieyasu, Tokugawa Yorinobu, and finally Tokugawa Ietsuna. It remained in the Kii (紀伊) branch of the Tokugawa family, and this ownership continued after the end of the Tokugawa Shogunate (1868). The last known owner was Tokugawa Iemasa at the end of World War II.

Under the United States occupation at the end of World War II, all production of nihontō with edges was banned except under police or government permit.  The Americans required that all swords be surrendered to the Foreign Liquidation Commission. Tokugawa Iemasa turned in the Honjō Masamune and 13 other "prized heirloom" swords to a police station at Mejiro in December 1945.

In January 1946, the Mejiro police gave the swords to a man identified as "Sgt. Coldy Bimore" (possibly a garbled phonetic spelling of the man's name) of the Foreign Liquidations Commission of AFWESPAC (Army Forces, Western Pacific). In an episode of Expedition Unknown, Josh Gates traveled to Japan in search of the Honjō Masamune and learned that there were no records of a "Sgt. Coldy Bimore" listed to have received the sword.  The Honjō Masamune is the most important of the missing Japanese swords, and its current location remains unknown. Only vague theories exist as to the location of the sword.

Fudo Masamune
This is one of the few blades signed by Masamune that is not in question as to the signature. It was bought by Toyotomi Hidetsugu in 1601 for 500 Kan and was passed to Shōgun Ieyasu and from him to Maeda Toshiie. Maeda Toshitsune presented it again to the shōgun, possibly on his retirement. Later, the sword was handed down among the Owari Tokugawa. This blade is a tantō (dagger) approximately 25 cm (8 sun 6.5 bun) with a carving of roots on the omote (front, outer edge) side. It also has chopstick-like grooves (gomabashi 護摩箸) on the back and a dragon at the ura part of blade (kurikara 倶利伽羅). The blade features an engraving of Fudō Myō-ō, the Buddhist deity which gives this blade its name.

The Fudo Masamune is one of the few surviving blades that is known for sure to have been made and signed by the legendary swordsmith and from the early 1600s, it was in the possession of the Owari branch of the Tokugawa clan. It is a made primarily for stabbing but with a sharp edge allowing it to be useful for slashing also.

Musashi Masamune

A peculiar work of Masamune, once in the possession of the Tokugawa Shogunate through the Kii Domain and gifted to the main Tokugawa family line in Edo in its prime. Upon the end of the Tokugawa Era marked by the Bakumatsu, the Musashi Masamune was presented as a gift by Tokugawa Iesato in honor of Yamaoka Tesshū's efforts to facilitate peaceful negotiation with Katsu Kaishū to Saigō Takamori, sparing Edo from war and needless destruction; however, Yamaoka was humbled upon being given such a masterpiece, and had passed it down to statesman Iwakura Tomomi. Soon after seeing it passed from hand to hand throughout the 20th Century, the Musashi Masamune finally made its way to the Nihon Bijutsu Token Hozon Kyokai in the year 2000 by Motoo Otsuyasu. The Musashi Masamune is a tachi, measuring 74 cm (2 korai-shaku, 1 sun, 4.2 bun) and noted to have nearly all of the characteristics of Masamune's signature features; though it is debated that its o-kissaki is not that of his style, it is compared to blades made in his later career, which shows the transition of the Kamakura styles into the Nanbokucho era. It is rumored that, while the blade is named after Musashi Province, where Edo and current day Tokyo stands, its origin stems from being once in the possession of Miyamoto Musashi, who is considered Japan's most famous swordsman. The sword is classified as a meibutsu.

In 2000, this sword was acquired by the Society for the Preservation of Japanese Art Swords with the assistance of Motoo Otsuyasu.

Hōchō Masamune
The "Hōchō" Masamune refers to any one of three particular and unusual tantō attributed to Masamune. These tantō have a wide body, unlike his normal slim and elegant work, making them appear quite similar to a Japanese cooking knife. One of the three blades has a gomabashi in cutout (sukashi). It was restored around 1919 and sold for approximately 10 hiki (a certain number of mon); this was worth roughly 14¢ US at the time, meaning that the price was remarkably low.

All three have been displayed within the Tokugawa Art Museum.

Kotegiri Masamune
Kotegiri means "Kote cutter". In this case kote is a contraction of  yugote (弓籠手), an archer's arm-guard. This name comes from when Asakura Ujikage cut an opposing samurai's yugote in the battle of Toji in Kyôto. Oda Nobunaga gained possession of this sword and had it shortened to its present length. In 1615, it passed down to the Maeda clan who in 1882 presented it as a gift to Emperor Meiji, a known sword collector.

Masamune in Harry S. Truman Library
A Masamune was given to President Harry S. Truman shortly after World War II. It is kept in the Harry S. Truman Presidential Library and Museum.

See also 
 Hikoshiro Hiromitsu
 List of Wazamono
 Muramasa

References 

Nuttall, Zelia. "The Earliest Historical Relations between Mexico and Japan, from original documents preserved in Spain and Japan". (1906)
https://archive.org/details/earliesthistoric00nuttrich

Japanese swordsmiths
13th-century Japanese people